General elections were held in Sikkim in March 1967, having been due earlier but postponed after a state of emergency was declared following the Sino-Indian War. The Sikkim National Congress emerged as the largest single party, winning eight of the 24 seats. Although the Sikkim National Party won only five seats, its parliamentary faction was joined by three others (one each from the Tsong (Limbu), Sangha and scheduled caste reserved seats).

Electoral system
The State Council was established in 1953 by the Chogyal. It originally had 18 members, of which 12 were elected and six (including the President) appointed by the Chogyal. Of the 12 elected members, six were for the Nepali community and six for the Bhutia-Lepcha community. For the 1958 elections the number of seats was increased to 20 by adding one seat for the Sangha and an additional appointed member. In 1966, a further four seats had been added; one each for the Nepali and Lepcha/Bhutia communities, together with one for the Tsong (Limbu) and a scheduled caste seat.

Candidates for election to the Council had to be at least 30 years old, whilst the voting age was set at 21.

Results

Constituency-wise

Appointed members
In addition to the elected members, six members were appointed to the Sikkim State Council by the Chogyal, which included R. N. Haldipur (Dewan of Sikkim and President of the Council), M. M. Rasailly, Hon. Lt. P. B. Basnet, Sonam Wangyal, I. B. Gurung, and Sangey Tempo.

Executive Council
From the elected members, the following were appointed as members of the Executive Council, by the Chogyal:

References

Elections in Sikkim
Sikkim
1960s in Sikkim
Election and referendum articles with incomplete results
March 1967 events in Asia